The Parish of Baw Baw is a parish of Argyle County, New South Wales, Australia.

A village of Baw Baw was surveyed on the banks of the Wollondilly River, but was never constructed.

History
The Baw Baw area was first inhabited by the Gundungurra people, and by the mid 1840s the NSW colonial government had granted numerous land grants in area, beginning white settlement.

References

Parishes of Argyle County